Amund Ringnes Island is an uninhabited island and one of the Sverdrup Islands and Queen Elizabeth Islands in the Qikiqtaaluk Region, Nunavut, Canada. It is located in the Arctic Ocean, between 78 and 79 degrees of latitude. It lies east of Ellef Ringnes Island, west of Axel Heiberg Island. Hassel Sound separates Amund Ringnes Island from Ellef Ringnes Island. Hendriksen Strait is to the south, as is Cornwall Island. Norwegian Bay is to the east, as is Haig-Thomas Island. To the north lies Peary Channel.

The island was named by Otto Sverdrup for Oslo brewer Amund Ringnes, one of the sponsors of his expedition. He first sighted it in 1900. The island was claimed by Norway from 1902 until the claim was relinquished in 1930.

References

External sources

 Amund Ringnes Island at The Columbia Gazetteer of North America. 2000.
 The Ringnes Islands University of Guelph

Further reading

 Atkinson, Nigel. Late Wisconsinan Glacial and Relative Sea Level History of Amund and Ellef Ringnes Islands, Nunavut, Canada. Ottawa: Library and Archives Canada = Bibliothèque et Archives Canada, 2005. 
 Balkwill, H. R. Geology of Amund Ringnes, Cornwall, and Haig-Thomas Islands, District of Franklin. Ottawa, Ont., Canada: Geological Survey of Canada, 1983. 
 Hodgson, D. A. Surficial Materials and Geomorphological Processes, Western Sverdrup and Adjacent Islands, District of Franklin (Including Amund Ringnes, Southern Ellef Ringnes, Cornwall, Graham and King Christian Islands). Ottawa: Geological Survey of Canada, 1982. 
 Hopkins, W. S. Some Spores and Pollen from the Christopher Formation (Albian) of Ellef and Amund Ringnes Island, and Northwestern Melville Island, Arctic Archipelago. [Ottawa]: Dept. of Energy, Mines and Resources, 1974.

External links
 Amund Ringnes Island in the Atlas of Canada - Toporama; Natural Resources Canada

Islands of the Queen Elizabeth Islands
Sverdrup Islands
Uninhabited islands of Qikiqtaaluk Region